Columbus Christian School is a private, Christian school in Columbus, Indiana. Established in 1976, Columbus Christian School is an inter-denominational private school offering Christian education to children from Preschool through the twelfth grade. CCS believes God has specifically gifted each child and they desire to come alongside parents in the purposeful discipleship of their children through Christ-centered academics, promoting athletic excellence and giving students opportunities to develop gifts through the arts. These goals are uniquely enhanced through small class sizes and a family environment.

External links
Official website

Christian schools in Indiana
Private schools in Indiana
1976 establishments in Indiana